MVA may refer to:

In arts and entertainment
Monsters vs. Aliens, a 2009 animated film
Music Video Awards, presented by the cable channel MTV
MX vs. ATV, a crossover racing video game series

Businesses
MVA in Asia, a global consultancy firm
Mississippi Valley Airlines, a defunct US airline

In economics and finance
Margin Valuation Adjustment, one of the X-Value Adjustments in relation to derivative instruments held by banks
Market Value Accounting, an alternative accounting method used by banks
Market value added, an economic metric
Market Value Appraiser, in real estate
Market value assessment, used in property taxation
Merverdiavgift, a Norwegian Value Added Tax (VAT)

In politics
Maha Vikas Aghadi, the ruling coalition of parties that has formed a government in Maharashtra, India

In mathematics
Mean value analysis, a solution technique for separable closed queueing networks
Multivariate analysis, a collection of procedures that involve observation and analysis of more than one statistical variable at a time

In science and technology

In biology and medicine
Malignant ventricular arrhythmia, a heart problem
Manual vacuum aspiration, a method of abortion that consists of removing the embryo by suction
Mevalonic acid, an important compound in molecular biology
Mimotope Variation Analysis, an immunoprofiling technology
Mitral valve area
Modified vaccinia Ankara, a virus modified to carry vaccines

In computing and telecommunications
Microsoft Virtual Academy, a free online training area for Microsoft technologies
Model–view–adapter, a framework for creating computer user interfaces
Multi-domain Vertical Alignment, an LCD display technology

Other uses in science and technology
Megavolt-ampere, a unit of measure of apparent power
Minimum Vectoring Altitude, the lowest altitude Air Traffic Control will typically use for radar vectoring of aircraft

Other uses
Motor vehicle accident, or multi-vehicle accident
Motor Vehicle Administration, in Maryland
Motor Voter Act, an alternative name for the National Voter Registration Act of 1993